Hortia superba is a mid-story rainforest tree in the family Rutaceae. It is native to the Amazon Basin.

Description

Reference

Zanthoxyloideae
Taxa named by Adolpho Ducke